Tatyana Bogomyagkova (born 4 July 1972) is a Russian judoka. She competed in the women's half-middleweight event at the 1996 Summer Olympics.

References

1972 births
Living people
Russian female judoka
Olympic judoka of Russia
Judoka at the 1996 Summer Olympics
Sportspeople from Perm, Russia